Ross Scott Rawlings (born  ) is an American pianist, composer, conductor, and music director.

Early life and education 
Rawlings was born {Circa 1965}  to Daryl Lee (née Prysock) and Dennis Scott Rawlings. His mother was a contract analyst for the Government of Maryland and his father was a collection agent. Ross Rawlings and his brother, Kevin D. Rawlings lived in Baltimore County, but later moved to Harford County, Maryland before middle school. He began taking piano lessons at the age of 4 and started a singing group in middle school that continued through high school. When Rawlings was 16, he was injured in a car crash while en route to the first orchestra rehearsal for a production of Seesaw at Liberty Showcase Theatre in [Randallstown, Maryland], [Maryland]. He was in a hospital for over a month due to broken ribs, wrists, kneecaps, sternum and fractured elbows. Despite the crash, Rawlings was able to conduct and play piano for the production. In 1993, Rawlings earned a Bachelor's of Science in Music Education and Piano from Towson University.

Career 
Rawlings became the resident musical director of Toby's Dinner Theatre circa 1989. For four years in the mid-1990s, Rawlings also taught at Atholton High School. In the early 2000s, Rawlings was the conductor for the national/international tour of Fosse directed by Ann Reinking/Debra McWaters. In 2006, he was the musical director for broadway revival of Sweet Charity. At Olney Theatre Center in 2012, Rawlings conducted and orchestrated a production of A Chorus Line and was the musical director for Little Shop of Horrors. Rawlings was the musical director of Rep Stage's 2014 production of The Fantasticks. Rawlings was the Director of Choral Activities and Piano at Glenelg High School 2012-2018. In 2017, composer Stacey V. Gibbs wrote a piece of music entitled Go Down, Moses for the Glenelg choir and dedicated it to the students and Rawlings. Rawlings was the musical director of the inaugural premier of the musical, Magic Under Glass, by the Columbia Center for Theatrical Arts under the direction of Toby Orenstein.

Personal life 
In the mid-1990s, Rawlings purchased a house in Columbia, Maryland where he lived for 16 years. As of 2012, he resides in Mount Airy, Maryland.

Awards and nominations

References

External links 

20th-century American pianists
21st-century American composers
American male conductors (music)
Music directors
1960s births
Living people
21st-century American pianists
20th-century American composers
20th-century American conductors (music)
21st-century American conductors (music)
People from Baltimore County, Maryland
People from Harford County, Maryland
Musicians from Maryland
Towson University alumni
American male pianists
20th-century American male musicians
21st-century American male musicians